Bellefonte Armory is a historic National Guard armory located at Bellefonte, Centre County, Pennsylvania, United States. It was built in 1930, and consists of an administration building and stable building executed in the Colonial Revival style. Both buildings are constructed of brick and have slate hipped roofs.

It was designed by American architect Joseph F. Kuntz.

It was added to the National Register of Historic Places in 1989.

References

Armories on the National Register of Historic Places in Pennsylvania
Colonial Revival architecture in Pennsylvania
Government buildings completed in 1930
Buildings and structures in Centre County, Pennsylvania
National Register of Historic Places in Centre County, Pennsylvania